The neonatal Fc receptor (also FcRn, IgG receptor FcRn large subunit p51, or Brambell receptor) is a protein that in humans is encoded by the FCGRT gene. It is an IgG Fc receptor which is similar in structure to the MHC class I molecule and also associates with beta-2-microglobulin.  In rodents, FcRn was originally identified as the receptor that transports maternal immunoglobulin G (IgG) from mother to neonatal offspring via mother's milk, leading to its name as the neonatal Fc receptor. In humans, FcRn is present in the placenta where it transports mother's IgG to the growing fetus. FcRn has also been shown to play a role in regulating IgG and serum albumin turnover. Neonatal Fc receptor expression is up-regulated by the proinflammatory cytokine, TNF-α, and down-regulated by IFN-γ.

Interactions of FcRn with IgG and serum albumin 
In addition to binding to IgG, FCGRT has been shown to interact with human serum albumin. FcRn-mediated transcytosis of IgG across epithelial cells is possible because FcRn binds IgG at acidic pH (<6.5) but not at neutral or higher pH. The binding site for FcRn on IgG has been mapped using functional and structural studies, and involves in the interaction of relatively well conserved histidine residues on IgG with acidic residues on FcRn.

FcRn-mediated recycling and transcytosis of IgG and serum albumin 
FcRn extends the half-life of IgG and serum albumin by reducing lysosomal degradation of these proteins in endothelial cells and bone-marrow derived cells. The clearance rate of IgG and albumin is abnormally short in mice that lack functional FcRn. IgG, serum albumin and other serum proteins are continuously internalized into cells through pinocytosis. Generally, internalized serum proteins are transported from early endosomes to lysosomes, where they are degraded. Following entry into cells, the two most abundant serum proteins, IgG and serum albumin, are bound by FcRn at the slightly acidic pH (<6.5) within early (sorting) endosomes, sorted and recycled to the cell surface where they are released at the neutral pH (>7.0) of the extracellular environment. In this way, IgG and serum albumin are salvaged to avoid lysosomal degradation. This cellular mechanism provides an explanation for the prolonged in vivo half-lives of IgG and serum albumin and transport of these ligands across cellular barriers. In addition, for cell types bathed in an acidic environment such as the slightly acidic intestinal lumen, cell surface FcRn can bind to IgG, transport bound ligand across intestinal epithelial cells followed by release at the near neutral pH at the basolateral surface.

Diverse roles for FcRn in various organs 

FcRn is expressed on antigen-presenting leukocytes such as dendritic cells and is also expressed in neutrophils to help clear opsonized bacteria. In the kidneys, FcRn is expressed on epithelial cells called podocytes to prevent IgG and albumin from clogging the glomerular filtration barrier. Current studies are investigating FcRn in the liver because there are relatively low concentrations of both IgG and albumin in liver bile despite high concentrations in the blood. Studies have also shown that FcRn-mediated transcytosis is involved with the trafficking of the HIV-1 virus across genital tract epithelium.

Half-life extension of therapeutic proteins 
The identification of FcRn as a central regulator of IgG levels led to the engineering of IgG-FcRn interactions to increase in vivo persistence of IgG. For example, the half-life extended complement C5-specific antibody, Ultomiris (ravulizumab), has been approved for the treatment of autoimmunity and a half-life extended antibody cocktail (Evusheld) with 'YTE' mutations is used for the prophylaxis of SARS-CoV2.  Engineering of albumin-FcRn interactions has also generated albumin variants with increased in vivo half-lives. It has also been shown that conjugation of some drugs to the Fc region of IgG or serum albumin to generate fusion proteins significantly increases their half-life.

There are several drugs on the market that have Fc portions fused to the effector proteins in order to increase their half-lives through FcRn-mediated recycling. They include: Amevive (alefacept), Arcalyst (rilonacept), Enbrel (etanercept), Nplate (romiplostim), Orencia (abatacept) and Nulojix (belatacept). Enbrel (etanercept) was the first successful IgG Fc-linked soluble receptor therapeutic and works by binding and neutralizing the pro-inflammatory cytokine, TNF-α.

Targeting FcRn to treat autoimmune disease 

Multiple autoimmune disorders are caused by the binding of IgG to self antigens. Since FcRn extends IgG half-life in the circulation, it can also confer long half-lives on these pathogenic antibodies and promote autoimmune disease. Therapies seek to disrupt the IgG-FcRn interaction to increase the clearance of disease-causing IgG autoantibodies from the body. One such therapy is the infusion of intravenous immunoglobulin (IVIg) to saturate FcRn's IgG recycling capacity and proportionately reduce the levels of disease-causing IgG autoantibody binding to FcRn, thereby increasing disease-causing IgG autoantibody removal. More recent approaches involve the strategy of blocking the binding of IgG to FcRn by delivering antibodies that bind with high affinity to this receptor through their Fc region or variable regions. These engineered Fc fragments or antibodies are being used in clinical trials as treatments for antibody-mediated autoimmune diseases such as primary immune thrombocytopenia and skin blistering diseases (pemphigus), and the Fc-based inhibitor, efgartigimod, based on the 'Abdeg' technology was recently approved (as 'Vyvgart') for the treatment of generalized myasthenia gravis in December 2021.

References

Further reading

External links 
 

Fc receptors